Wasungen-Amt Sand is a Verwaltungsgemeinschaft ("collective municipality") in the district Schmalkalden-Meiningen, in Thuringia, Germany. The seat of the Verwaltungsgemeinschaft is in Wasungen.

The Verwaltungsgemeinschaft Wasungen-Amt Sand consists of the following municipalities:
Friedelshausen 
Mehmels
Schwallungen
Wasungen

References

Verwaltungsgemeinschaften in Thuringia